The Iroquoian languages are a language family of indigenous peoples of North America. They are known for their general lack of labial consonants. The Iroquoian languages are polysynthetic and head-marking.

As of 2020, all surviving Iroquoian languages are severely or critically endangered, with only a few elderly speakers remaining. The two languages with the most speakers, Mohawk in New York and Cherokee, are spoken by less than 10% of the populations of their tribes.

Family division

Northern Iroquoian
Lake Iroquoian
Iroquois Proper
Seneca (severely endangered)
Cayuga (severely endangered)
Onondaga (severely endangered)
Susquehannock/Conestoga (*)
Mohawk–Oneida
Oneida (severely endangered)
Mohawk
Huronian (*)
Huron-Wyandot (*)
Petun (Tobacco) (*)
Tuscarora–Nottoway (*)
Tuscarora (*)
Nottoway (*)
Unclear
Wenrohronon/Wenro (*)
Neutral (*)
Erie (*)
Laurentian (*)
Southern Iroquoian:
Cherokee language
Cherokee (South Carolina-Georgia Dialect) (Also known as Lower Dialect) (*)
Cherokee (North Carolina Dialect) (Also known as Middle or Kituwah Dialect) (severely endangered)
Cherokee (Oklahoma Dialect) (Also known as Overhill or Western Dialect) (definitely endangered)
(*) — language extinct/dormant

Evidence is emerging that what has been called the Laurentian language appears to be more than one dialect or language. Ethnographic and linguistic field work with the Wyandot tribal elders (Barbeau 1960) yielded enough documentation for scholars to characterize and classify the Huron and Petun languages.

The  languages of the tribes that constituted the tiny Wenrohronon, the powerful Conestoga Confederacy and the confederations of the Neutral Nation and the Erie Nation are very poorly documented in print.  The Neutral were called Atiwandaronk, meaning 'they who understand the language' by the Huron (Wyandot people). They are historically grouped together, and geographically the Wenro's range on the eastern end of Lake Erie placed them between the  larger confederations. To the east of the Wenro, beyond the Genesee Gorge, were the lands of the Haudenosaunee Confederacy and southeast, beyond the headwaters of the Allegheny River, lay the Conestoga (Susquehannocks).  The Conestoga Confederacy and Erie were militarily powerful and respected by neighboring tribes.  By 1660 all of these peoples but the Conestoga Confederacy and the Haudenosaunee Confederacy were defeated and scattered, migrating to form new tribes or adopted into others—the practice of adopting valiant enemies into the tribe was a common cultural tradition of the Iroquoian peoples.

The group known as the Meherrin were neighbors to the Tuscarora and the Nottoway (Binford 1967) in the American South and may have spoken an Iroquoian language.  There is not enough data to determine this with certainty.

External relationships
Attempts to link the Iroquoian, Siouan, and Caddoan languages in a Macro-Siouan family are suggestive but remain unproven (Mithun 1999:305).

Linguistics and language revitalization 
As of 2012, a program in Iroquois linguistics at Syracuse University, the Certificate in Iroquois Linguistics for Language Learners, is designed for students and language teachers working in language revitalization.

Six Nations Polytechnic in Ohsweken, Ontario offers Ogwehoweh language Diploma and Degree Programs in Mohawk or Cayuga.

Starting in September 2017, the University of Waterloo in Waterloo, Ontario started offering a credit course in Mohawk; the classes are to be given at Renison University College in collaboration with the Waterloo Aboriginal Education Centre, St. Paul's University College.

See also

Proto-Iroquoian language

Notes

References

Further reading

Linguistics

.
.
.
.
.
 
.
.
.
.

General works
Driver, Harold E. 1969. Indians of North America. 2nd edition. University of Chicago Press. 
Ruttenber, Edward Manning. 1992 [1872]. History of the Indian tribes of Hudson's River. Hope Farm Press.
Snow, Dean R. 1994. The Iroquois. Blackwell Publishers. Peoples of America. 
Snow, Dean R.; Gehring, Charles T; Starna, William A. 1996. In Mohawk country: early narratives about a native people. Syracuse University Press. An anthology of primary sources from 1634–1810.

 
Language families
Indigenous languages of the North American eastern woodlands
First Nations languages in Canada
Native American language revitalization
Languages of the United States